Sebastian Emil Stakset Konstenius (born 20 December 1985) is a Swedish rapper, singer, author, and actor. His 2019 single "Mamma förlåt", a collaboration with Einár, reached the Swedish top 10. A song by Einár featuring Stakset, "Ingen som varna mig", also reached the top 40 the same year.

Discography

Albums

Singles

References 

Articles needing translation from Swedish Wikipedia
Gangsta rappers
1985 births
Living people
Writers from Stockholm
Singers from Stockholm
Male actors from Stockholm
Swedish hip hop musicians
Swedish rappers